The Writers Guild of America Award for Best Adapted Screenplay is one of the three screenwriting Writers Guild of America Awards, focused specifically for film. The Writers Guild of America began making the distinction between an original screenplay and an adapted screenplay in 1970, when Waldo Salt, screenwriter for Midnight Cowboy, won for "Best Adapted Drama" and Arnold Schulman won "Best Adapted Comedy" for his screenplay of Goodbye, Columbus. Separate awards for dramas and comedies continued until 1985.

Winners and nominees

1960s

1970s

1980s

1990s

2000s

2010s

2020s

Writers with multiple awards
3 Awards
Alexander Payne

2 Awards
Francis Ford Coppola
Blake Edwards
Mario Puzo
Waldo Salt
Alvin Sargent
Jim Taylor

Writers with multiple nominations
The following writers have received three or more nominations:
6 Nominations
Steven Zaillian

5 Nominations
Eric Roth

4 Nominations
Alexander Payne
Aaron Sorkin

3 Nominations
Scott Frank
Ruth Prawer Jhabvala
David Mamet
Elaine May
Anthony Minghella
Oliver Stone
Jim Taylor

References

External links 
 

Screenwriting awards for film
Screenplay, Adapted